The Batignolles-Chatillon 155 mm is a self-propelled artillery developed in France by the Batignolles-Châtillon company in the post-war years.

History 
The Batignolles-Chatillon 155 mm self-propelled artillery project was started after the cancellation of the Lorraine 155 mm project.

Turret 
The Batignolles-Chatillon 155 mm had a turret installed for rotation of the gun. This make the vehicle unique as other contemporary self-propelled artillery of that period did not have a rotating turret.

Armament 
The vehicle was planned to inherit the 155 mm gun from the Lorraine 155 mm. It was also designed to equip an autoloader. The vehicle can carry a maximum of 36 shells.

Chassis 
The chassis of the vehicle is based on the Batignolles Chatillon Char 25t with improved suspension. the track was taken from the M47 patton along with the sprockets

Development 
The prototype was built in 1955. The program was abandoned in December 1959 with only one wooden prototype built.

Reference 

155 mm artillery
Tracked self-propelled howitzers
Cold War artillery of France
Abandoned military projects of France
Tanks with autoloaders